The UC Davis College of Engineering is one of four undergraduate colleges on the campus of the University of California, Davis.  One of the largest engineering programs in the U.S., the UC Davis College of Engineering offers 11 ABET-accredited undergraduate engineering majors. The college offers majors from a broad scope of engineering disciplines, including aerospace science, biochemical, biological systems, biomedical, chemical, civil, computer science, electrical, materials science, and mechanical engineering.

The college attracted more than $87.4 million in research grants in fiscal year 2013–14.

Departments
The college is organized into eight departments, which offer various programs of study: 
 Biological and Agricultural Engineering
 Biomedical Engineering
 Chemical Engineering
 Civil and Environmental Engineering
 Computer Science
 Electrical and Computer Engineering
 Materials Science and Engineering
 Mechanical and Aerospace Engineering

Notable alumni
Notable alumni of the College of Engineering include:
 David Abe,  head of the Electromagnetics Technology Branch at the U.S. Naval Research Laboratory.
 Adam Steltzner, NASA JPL Lead Engineer
 Clare Bell, British author in the United States best known for her Ratha series
 Diane Bryant, executive vice president of Intel
 Kyle Bryant, athlete, speaker
 Anthony Cannella, California State Senator
 Chow Chung-kong, chairman of Hong Kong Exchanges and Clearing
 Alfred Chuang, former CEO and president of BEA Systems, founder and current CEO of Magnet Systems
 Ahmed Darwish (Politician), Egyptian politician
 David Kappos, Under Secretary of Commerce for Intellectual Property and Director of the United States Patent and Trademark Office (USPTO) from 2009 to 2013
 Giovonnae Dennis, one of the first African-American women to earn a PhD
 Steve Robinson, NASA astronaut.
 William L. Ballhaus, CEO of Blackboard, Inc.
 Carl Sassenrath, computer scientist
 Constance J. Chang-Hasnain, professor at UC Berkeley.
 Scott Miller, leader of 1980's band Game Theory
 Richard Miller (Olin College President), president of Olin College.
 Stratton Sclavos, chairman of the board, president and chief executive officer of VeriSign
 Howard A. Stone, professor at Princeton University.
 Bernard Soriano, Chief Information Officer (CIO) for the California Department of Motor Vehicles.
 Koosha Toofan, bodybuilder
 Daniel Ha, founder of Disqus.
 Julie A. MacDonald, deputy assistant secretary for Fish and Wildlife and Parks at the United States Department of the Interior
 Mark Matsumoto, dean of engineering at UC Merced. 
 Éric Maurincomme, director of INSA Lyon.
 Kaveh Madani, Iranian civil and environmental engineer
 Jani Macari Pallis, CEO of Cislunar Aerodynamics, professor at University of Bridgeport.
 Jeffrey Steefel, video game developer. 
 Indira Samarasekera, President of the University of Alberta
 Sig Mejdal, sabermetrics analyst, former NASA engineer.
 David Phillips (entrepreneur)
 Seth Weil, Olympic rower.
 Alvin S. White, test pilot, mechanical engineer

See also
Department of Applied Science, UC Davis

References

University of California, Davis
Educational institutions established in 1962
Engineering universities and colleges in California
1962 establishments in California